"Man of Sorrows" is the second single from Bruce Dickinson's fourth solo album, Accident of Birth, released on 3 June 1997.

Writing and recording
The song was originally written for a film called Chemical Wedding, which existed only as a script at the time (it was eventually filmed and released in May 2008). The original version of the song, included on The Best of Bruce Dickinson, was recorded in 1990, engineered by André Jacquemin (who is better known for his sound-engineer work for Monty Python), and featured Janick Gers on guitar.

Track listing 
 "Man Of Sorrows"  (Radio Edit -Single Chorus) – 3:57
 "Man Of Sorrows"  (Radio Edit -Double Chorus) – 4:24
 "Man Of Sorrows"  (Spanish Version) – 5:18
 "Man Of Sorrows"  (Spanish Version -Single Chorus) – 3:57
 "Man Of Sorrows"  (Orchestral Version) – 5:20

Personnel
 Bruce Dickinson – Vocals
 Adrian Smith – Guitar
 Roy Z –  Guitar
 Eddie Casillas – Bass
 David Ingraham – Drums

Legacy
A Spanish version of the song, "Hombre Triste", is included on the 2005 expanded edition of Accident of Birth. A radio edit and an orchestral version of "Man of Sorrows" are included on the same CD.

Notes

1997 singles
1997 songs
Bruce Dickinson songs
Songs written by Bruce Dickinson